Carmen Lorenzo Nivar (born 16 January 2001) is a Dominican footballer who plays as a centre back for Academia 5 de Abril and the Dominican Republic women's national team.

Early life
Lorenzo hails from San Cristóbal.

Club career
Lorenzo has played for Academia 5 de Abril in the Dominican Republic.

International career
Lorenzo represented the Dominican Republic at the 2020 CONCACAF Women's U-20 Championship. She made her senior debut on 21 February 2021 in a 0–2 friendly home loss to Puerto Rico.

References

2001 births
Living people
People from San Cristóbal, Dominican Republic
Dominican Republic women's footballers
Women's association football central defenders
Dominican Republic women's international footballers